Marjan Radeski (born 10 February 1995) is a Macedonian professional footballer who plays for FC Pyunik as a winger.

Club career
Radeski kicked off his career with FK 11 Oktomvri in 2011, before being transferred to FK Metalurg a season later. In 2013, he won the Young player of the season award.

On 3 July 2022, Armenian Premier League club Pyunik announced the signing of Marjan Radeski. On 29 December 2022, Pyunik announced that Radeski had left the club.

On 16 January 2023, Struga announced the signing of Radeski.

International career
On 18 June 2014, Radeski made his international debut against China where he was substituted in for Blaže Todorovski in the 73rd minute. On 29 May 2016, Radeski scored his first international goal against Azerbaijan in Austria. As of April 2020, he has earned a total of 16 caps, scoring 1 goal.

International goals
As of match played 29 May 2016. Macedonia score listed first, score column indicates score after each Radeski goal.

Honours

Club
Shkendija
Macedonian Football Cup: 2015–16

References

External links
Profile at Macedonian Football 
 
 

1995 births
Living people
Sportspeople from Prilep
Association football forwards
Macedonian footballers
North Macedonia youth international footballers
North Macedonia under-21 international footballers
North Macedonia international footballers
FK 11 Oktomvri players
FK Metalurg Skopje players
KF Shkëndija players
Macedonian First Football League players
UEFA Euro 2020 players